Chali Cheemalu is a 1978 Telugu film directed by Devadas Kanakala. Paruchuri Venkateswara Rao, elder of the Paruchuri Brothers entered the Telugu cinema field as writer. Novel of Mandha Venkata Ramana Rao was developed into a full-length movie by their writing skills. Nutan Prasad’s catch phrase Notokka jillaala andagaadni became popular among the Telugu audience. The film won two Nandi Awards.

Cast
 Nutan Prasad
 Rallapalli

Soundtrack
 Bhoomi Poye (Lyrics: Rallapalli; Singer: Rallapalli)

Awards
Nandi Awards - 1978
 Second Best Feature Film - Silver - J. Venkatarya.
 Best Story Writer - Mandha Venkataramana Rao

Legacy
Nutan Prasad’s catchphrase "Nootokka jillalaku andagadni" became popular among the Telugu audience. The phrase was adapted as a title for the film Nootokka Jillala Andagadu (2021)

References

1978 films
1970s Telugu-language films